<noinclude>

The UK Singles Chart is one of many music charts compiled by the Official Charts Company that calculates the best-selling singles of the week in the United Kingdom. Before 2004, the chart was only based on the sales of physical singles. New Musical Express (NME) magazine had published the United Kingdom record charts for the first time in 1952. NME originally published only a top 12 (although the first chart had a couple of singles that were tied so a top 15 was announced) but this was gradually extended to encompass a top 20 by October 1954. This list shows singles that peaked in the top 10 of the UK Singles Chart during 1954, as well as singles which peaked in 1953 and 1955 but were in the top 10 in 1954. The entry date is when the single appeared in the top 10 for the first time (week ending, as published by the Official Charts Company, which is six days after the chart is announced).

Seventy-three singles were in the top ten in 1954. Twelve singles from 1953 remained in the top 10 for several weeks at the beginning of the year, while "No One But You" by Billy Eckstine, "The Finger of Suspicion (Points at You)" by Dickie Valentine with The Stargazers and "Heartbeat" by Ruby Murray were all released in 1954 but did not reach their peak until 1955. "Chicka Boom" and "Cloud Lucky Seven" by Guy Mitchell and "Let's Have a Party" by Winifred Atwell were the singles from 1953 to reach their peak in 1954. Nineteen artists scored multiple entries in the top 10 in 1954. Alma Cogan, Petula Clark, Frank Sinatra and Ruby Murray were among the many artists who achieved their first UK charting top 10 single in 1954.

The 1953 Christmas number-one, "Answer Me" by Frankie Laine, remained at number-one for the first week of 1954. The first new number-one single of the year was "Oh Mein Papa" by Eddie Calvert. Overall, eleven different singles peaked at number-one in 1954, with eleven unique artists hitting that position.

Background

Multiple entries
Seventy-six singles charted in the top 10 in 1954, with sixty-four singles reaching their peak this year. Ten songs were recorded by several artists with each version reaching the top 10:
"Answer Me" - David Whitfield, Frankie Laine (both peaked 1953)
"Changing Partners" - Bing Crosby, Kay Starr
"I Saw Mommy Kissing Santa Claus" - The Beverley Sisters, Jimmy Boyd (both peaked 1953)
"If I Give My Heart to You" - Doris Day with The Mellomen, Joan Regan
"Oh Mein Papa" - Eddie Calvert, Eddie Fisher (version known as "Oh! My Papa")
"Skin Deep" - Duke Ellington, Ted Heath and His Music
"Swedish Rhapsody" - Mantovani, Ray Martin (both peaked 1953)
"This Ole House" - Billie Anthony, Rosemary Clooney
"Three Coins in the Fountain" - The Four Aces, Frank Sinatra
"Wanted" - Al Martino, Perry Como

Nineteen artists scored multiple entries in the top 10 in 1954. American Frankie Laine secured the record for most top 10 hits in 1954 with seven hit singles.

Rosemary Clooney was one of a number of artists with two top 10 entries, including the number-one single "This Ole House". Al Martino, Billy Cotton and His Band, Dean Martin and Max Bygraves were among the other artists who had multiple top 10 entries in 1954.

Chart debuts
Twenty artists achieved their first top 10 single in 1954, either as a lead or featured artist.

The following table (collapsed on desktop site) does not include acts who had previously charted as part of a group and secured their first top 10 solo single.

Songs from films
Original songs from various films entered the top 10 throughout the year. These included "Blowing Wild (The Ballad of Black Gold)" (from Blowing Wild), "That's Amore" (from The Caddy) "Secret Love" and "The Black Hills of Dakota" (Calamity Jane), "Three Coins in the Fountain" (Three Coins in the Fountain) and "Hold My Hand" (Susan Slept Here).

Best-selling singles
Until 1970 there was no universally recognised year-end best-sellers list. However, in 2011 the Official Charts Company released a list of the best-selling single of each year in chart history from 1952 to date. According to the list, "Secret Love" by Doris Day is officially recorded as the biggest-selling single of 1954.

Top-ten singles
Key

Entries by artist

The following table shows artists who achieved two or more top 10 entries in 1954, including singles that reached their peak in 1953 or 1955. The figures include both main artists and featured artists. The total number of weeks an artist spent in the top ten in 1954 is also shown.

Notes

 "No One But You" reached its peak of number three on 20 January 1955 (week ending).
 "Heartbeat" reached its peak of number three on 3 February 1955 (week ending).
 "Poppa Piccolino" re-entered the top 10 at number 5 on 14 January 1954 (week ending) for 2 weeks.
 "Chicka Boom" re-entered the top 10 at number 8 on 21 January 1954 (week ending) for 4 weeks.
 "Oh! My Papa" re-entered the top 10 at number 10 on 4 March 1954 (week ending).
 "Changing Partners" (Bing Crosby version) re-entered the top 10 at number 9 on 8 April 1954 (week ending).
 "Granada" re-entered the top 10 at number 9 on 15 April 1954 (week ending).
 "A Dime and a Dollar" re-entered the top 10 at number 9 on 20 May 1954 (week ending) and at number 8 on 3 June 1954 (week ending).

See also
1954 in British music
List of number-one singles from the 1950s (UK)

References
General

Specific

External links
1954 singles chart archive at the Official Charts Company (click on relevant week)

United Kingdom top-ten singles
1954
Top-ten singles